Dalat may refer to:

 Da Lat, capital of  Province, Vietnam
 Dalat, Myanmar, or Dalet, a town in Rakhine State, Myanmar (Burma)
 Dalat Banner, or Dalad Banner, county of Inner Mongolia, China
 Dalat, Sarawak, the administrative town of Dalat District, Malaysia
 Dalat District, an administrative district of Mukah in Sarawak, Malaysia
 Dalat (state constituency), represented in the Sarawak State Legislative Assembly